Pasindu Madushan (born 21 November 1992) is a Sri Lankan cricketer. He made his Twenty20 debut for Kalutara Town Club in the 2017–18 SLC Twenty20 Tournament on 24 February 2018.

References

External links
 

1992 births
Living people
Sri Lankan cricketers
Kalutara Town Club cricketers
Nugegoda Sports and Welfare Club cricketers
Place of birth missing (living people)